Cesar Naim Maalouf (Arabic: قيصر نعيم رزق المعلوف, from Zahle) is a Lebanese politician, businessman and ex-MP for the Lebanese Forces party. He is the owner of the famous oriental patisserie chain SeaSweet, founded by his father.

Biography 
He was born in 1978, in the town of Zahlé in Lebanon, and is a Greek Orthodox Christian.

He was member of parliament during the Lebanese legislative elections of 2018 for the Lebanese Forces's Strong Republic parliamentary bloc.

References 

Lebanese politicians
1978 births
Living people
People from Zahle

Eastern Orthodox Christians from Lebanon
Lebanese Forces politicians